Arsène Marie Paul Vauthier (1885-1979) was a French Major General. He was imprisoned in Colditz from 19 January 1945.

References

French generals
1880s births
1945 deaths
Prisoners of war held at Colditz Castle